In Greek mythology, Abaris (Ancient Greek: Ἄβαρις) was one of the Dolionians, a tribe that inhabited the southern shore of the Propontis.

Mythology 
The Doliones were ruled by King Cyzicus who welcomed the Argonauts on their voyage to take the Golden Fleece in Colchis. After the departure of the crew of Argo, a storm drove them back to the Cyzicene coast at night. With neither the Argonauts nor King Cyzicus recognizing one another, each mistook the other as an enemy, and battle ensued. Abaris was then killed by Jason during the battle between the Dolionians and the Argonauts.

 "The captain himself [i.e. Jason], lord of the field and of the battle, sweeps over heads and bodies wallowing in gore, like some black storm over the deep; Zelys and Brontes and Abaris he leaves half-dead.."

Note

References 

Gaius Valerius Flaccus, Argonautica translated by Mozley, J H. Loeb Classical Library Volume 286. Cambridge, MA, Harvard University Press; London, William Heinemann Ltd. 1928. Online version at theio.com.
Gaius Valerius Flaccus, Argonauticon. Otto Kramer. Leipzig. Teubner. 1913. Latin text available at the Perseus Digital Library.

Characters in Greek mythology